Kelly McCombie (born 4 January 1979) is an Australian Paralympic tandem cycling pilot. She was born in Sydney and lives in Perth. She began cycling in 1996 and went on to pilot visually impaired tandem cyclist Janet Shaw. At the Australian Championships before the 2004 Athens Paralympics, McCombie and her tandem partner broke two world records, including the 3 km pursuit, smashing 3 seconds off the world record time. The pair won two bronze medals at the 2004 Athens Games in the Women's Road Race / Time Trial Tandem B1-3 and the Women's Individual Pursuit Tandem B1-3.

References

External links
 

Paralympic cyclists of Australia
Cyclists at the 2004 Summer Paralympics
Medalists at the 2004 Summer Paralympics
Paralympic bronze medalists for Australia
Paralympic sighted guides
Cyclists from Perth, Western Australia
Sportswomen from New South Wales
Cyclists from Sydney
Sportswomen from Western Australia
1979 births
Living people
Australian female cyclists
Paralympic medalists in cycling